The 24th Regiment Grey's Horse was a Canadian Militia cavalry regiment and part of the Non-Permanent Active Militia.

History 
The regiment was originally formed in Oxford County, Ontario and Waterloo County, Ontario, on April 2, 1908, and named in honour of Albert Grey, 4th Earl Grey, Governor General of Canada. The regiment was headquartered in Woodstock with squadrons in Woodstock and Ingersoll. Its lineage can be traced to 1798 with The Oxford Rifles.

In 1914 it joined with the
22nd Regiment "The Oxford Rifles" to form A Company of the 1st Battalion, CEF.

Headquarters moved Wingham, Ontario, after World War I. In 1921 it was redesignated as the 9th (Grey's) Horse.

On 1 February 1936, the 9th Grey's Horse were disbanded along with 13 other regiments as part of the 1936 Canadian Militia Reorganization.

Commanding officers
 Lieutenant-Colonel William Mahlon Davis (1857–1918) 1908–1910
 Lieutenant-Colonel Thomas Richard Mayberry (1854–1934) 1910–1918
 Lieutenant-Colonel F. Ross 1918–?
 Lieutenant-Colonel E. Pettigrew 1925–?

Notable members
 Donald Matheson Sutherland, Minister of National Defence and former A Company Captain
 George Herbert Bowlby, medical officer and captain

See also 
 List of regiments of cavalry of the Canadian Militia (1900–1920)

References

Cavalry regiments of Canada
Military units and formations of Ontario
Military units and formations established in 1908
Military units and formations disestablished in 1936
1936 disestablishments in Canada